Vladimir Sokolov is a former international speedway rider from the Ukrainian SSR, Soviet Union.

Speedway career 
Sokolov reached the final of the Speedway World Team Cup in the 1965 Speedway World Team Cup.

World final appearances

World Team Cup
 1965 -  Kempten (with Yuri Chekranov / Igor Plekhanov / Gennady Kurilenko / Viktor Trofimov) - 4th - 7pts (2)

References 

Russian speedway riders
Living people
Year of birth missing (living people)